Piotr Feliks (11 June 1883 in Bierówka near Jasło – 3 or 12 August 1941) was a Polish political, social and education activist.

He was imprisoned and murdered during the Second World War at Auschwitz concentration camp.

References
Polish Biographical Dictionary

1883 births
1941 deaths
Polish schoolteachers
Polish politicians
Polish people who died in Auschwitz concentration camp
Politicians who died in Nazi concentration camps
Polish civilians killed in World War II
Education activists
People from Jasło County
People from the Kingdom of Galicia and Lodomeria